Werner Caskel (March 5, 1896, Danzig – January 28, 1970, Köln ) was a German historian of Muslim people. Caskel's specialties were Islamic history and tribal genealogy. 

He taught as professor at the University of Berlin (since 1946), University of Cologne (since 1948).

Literary works 
 Arabic inscriptions, 1936
 Die Beduinen (with Max von Oppenheim), 2 vols., 1939-1944
Kalbī, Hišām Ibn-Muḥammad al-: Ǧamharat an-nasab, 2 vols., 1966

External links 
 http://www.uni-koeln.de/phil-fak/orient/htm/library/oppenheim.htm 
 https://www.webcitation.org/query?url=http://www.geocities.com/martinkramerorg/JewishDiscovery.htm&date=2009-10-26+20:05:56

Historians of Islam
1896 births
1970 deaths
German male non-fiction writers
20th-century German historians